Alexander Chekalin may refer to:

 Alexander Alexeyevich Chekalin (born 1947), First Deputy Minister of the Interior
 Alexander Pavlovich Chekalin (1925–1941), Russian teenager, Soviet partisan, and Hero of the Soviet Union